Suensonomyia is a genus of flies in the family Tachinidae.

Species
S. setinerva Mesnil, 1953

References

Exoristinae
Diptera of Asia
Tachinidae genera